George Herman Babcock (June 17, 1832 – December 16, 1893) was an American inventor. He and Stephen Wilcox co-invented a safer water tube steam boiler, and founded the Babcock & Wilcox boiler company.

Biography
Babock was born in Unadilla Forks, New York in a family of inventors. As a boy he started his career in the woolen mill industry. When he was still in his teens he started a printing office in Westerly, Rhode Island. Here he founded the Literary Echo journal, which was later renamed The Narragansett and was continued until the end of the 19th century. Through his interest in photography he started a printing-press manufacture, for which he invented a polychromatic press for printing in several colors.

After moving to New York Babcock taught mechanical drawing at the Cooper Institute. He was a draughtsman for the Mystic Iron Company and the Hope Iron Company in Providence. Here with Stephen Wilcox he developed the Babcock and Wilcox engine, which was taken into production. They eventually founded the Babcock & Wilcox boiler company. From 1886-1887 Babcock served as president of the American Society of Mechanical Engineers.

Babcock's water tube steam boiler provided a safer and more efficient production of steam, and was built to work better under higher pressures than earlier boilers. In 1881 their company was incorporated, with Babcock as president and Wilcox as vice president.

He died in Plainfield, New Jersey on December 16, 1893.

In 1997, Babcock was inducted into the National Inventors Hall of Fame.

References

External links
 Biography from the American Society of Mechanical Engineers
 National Inventors Hall of Fame citation
 

1832 births
1893 deaths
19th-century American inventors
Presidents of the American Society of Mechanical Engineers
American mechanical engineers
People from Plainfield, New York
Burials in Rhode Island
Engineers from New York (state)
Inventors from New York (state)